Thomas Collins may refer to:

 Thomas Collins (governor) (1732–1789), American lawyer and Governor of Delaware
 Thomas Collins (pirate) (died 1719), English pirate active in the Indian Ocean
 Thomas Collins (British politician) (died 1884), Member of Parliament for Knaresborough and Boston
 Thomas Collins (bishop of Meath) (1873–1927), Irish Anglican bishop
 Thomas Collins (Australian politician) (1884–1945), Australian MP and Postmaster-General
 Thomas Patrick Collins (1915–1973), American-born Catholic bishop in Bolivia
 Thomas H. Collins (born 1946), retired Commandant of the United States Coast Guard
 Thomas Christopher Collins (born 1947), Canadian Roman Catholic Cardinal
 Thomas Collins (cricketer, born 1895) (1895–1964), English cricketer
 Thomas Collins (cricketer, born 1841) (1841–1934), English cricketer
 Thomas D. Collins (1847–1935), American soldier who fought in the American Civil War
 Tom Collins (rugby, born 1895) (Thomas John Collins, 1895–1957), rugby union and rugby league footballer of the 1920s for Wales (RU), Mountain Ash, and Hull (RL)
 Thomas LeRoy Collins (1909–1991), governor of Florida
 Thomas Collins (soldier), participant in the Battle of Rorke's Drift

See also
 Tom Collins (disambiguation)
 Tommy Collins (disambiguation)
 Collins (surname)